Višķi may refer to:

 Višķi, a village in the Latgale region of Latvia
 Višķi Parish, an administrative unit of the Daugavpils Municipality, Latvia

See also 

 Viski (disambiguation)